Mouldon Hill railway station is the proposed southern terminus of the Swindon and Cricklade Railway, a heritage railway line in England. The station will be situated opposite the River Ray which flows through and within Mouldon Hill Country Park.

References

Heritage railway stations in Wiltshire
Proposed railway stations in England